Kohistan, also transliterated Kuhistan, Kuhiston ( 'mountainous land'), is the northern district of Kapisa province, Afghanistan. In productive agricultural seasons the area has an abundance of sweet mulberries, grapes, apricots and pomegranates. Yearly thousands of visitors spend their weekends in its picnic place of Sayaad along the Panjshir river that flows into Sourubi lake. The population was 100,200 (2006), mainly Persian-speaking Tājik people.

Geography
The district is on the border of Parwan and Panjshir provinces.

History
The Kohistani Tajiks proved to be the most powerful and best organized groups that fought against the British occupation of Kabul in 1879 to 1880 in the Second Anglo-Afghan War. During the war against USSR, Kohistan was one of the strongholds and headquarters for the Mujaheddin and later on it was one of the last remaining areas that was not in control of the Taliban. The district was the front line against the Taliban, the people in district fought very hard and bravely to counter the attacks of the Taliban many times; and in one particular case the people of the district were forced to evacuate their homes and villages completely because of a Taliban attack.

In 2005 the district was dissolved and was split into two new districts:
Hesa Awal Kohistan District
Hesa Duwum Kohistan District

References 

District map of the former Kohestan District now split into Hesa Awal Kohistan District and Hesa Duwum Kohistan District
District Profile

External links 
Kohistani.Com - District Photo Gallery
Kohistan Discussion Forum
Kohistan Chat Room
Kohistan Web Site

Districts of Kapisa Province
Former districts of Afghanistan